Alfredo Ragona (born 26 December 1922) was the first Greek football player to compete in Italy's first division.

Career
Born in Corfu, Ragona was the first person born in Greece to play in Italy's Serie A. Ragona signed with Serie A side Bari in 1946, and spent one seasons with the club before moving to Serie B sides Cosenza and Napoli.

References

External links
Profile at Enciclopediadelcalcio

1922 births
Possibly living people
Greek footballers
Greek expatriate footballers
S.S.C. Bari players
Cosenza Calcio 1914 players
S.S.C. Napoli players
S.S.D. Città di Brindisi players
Association football forwards
Greek expatriate sportspeople in Italy
Expatriate footballers in Italy
Sportspeople from Corfu